Portage Glacier is a glacier on the Kenai Peninsula of the U.S. state of Alaska
and is included within the Chugach National Forest. It is located south of Portage Lake and 6 km (4 mi) west of Whittier.

Portage Glacier was a local name first recorded in 1898 by Thomas Corwin Mendenhall of the U.S. Coast and Geodetic Survey, so called because it is on a portage route between Prince William Sound and Turnagain Arm.

The Begich/Boggs Visitor Center (located here ) was built by the U.S. Forest Service in 1986.  However, the glacier can no longer be viewed from there.  In the summer a boat ride across the lake is required to view the glacier.  Commercial boat tours are available.  In the winter the glacier sees much foot, bike, and ski traffic if the lake freezes.

Geography 
Portage Glacier is located adjacent to Turnagain Arm, 50 miles southeast of downtown Anchorage.  Road access is via the Seward Highway to the former town of Portage, which was flooded and subsequently vacated following the 1964 Alaska earthquake.  The Portage Glacier Road runs , mostly past USFS campgrounds, to the Begich, Boggs Visitor Center.  The main road used to end here, but now continues eastward, leading to the Anton Anderson Memorial Tunnel and to Whittier.

See also 
 List of glaciers

References

External links
Visitors Center

Glaciers of Anchorage, Alaska
Glaciers of Alaska
Glaciers of Kenai Peninsula Borough, Alaska
Portages in the United States